Michael Garrity (born 11 January 1989) is an American professional rugby union player. He plays as a centre for the Seattle Seawolves in Major League Rugby, previously playing for Denver Stampede in PRO Rugby

References

Living people
American rugby union players
Rugby union centres
Seattle Seawolves players
Denver Stampede players
1989 births
Colorado State University alumni
People from Centennial, Colorado
Sportspeople from Colorado
United States international rugby union players